Idan David is an Israeli footballer who plays for Hapoel Herzliya.

Honours
Liga Alef (3):
2012–13, 2013–14, 2015–16
Liga Leumit (1): 
2014–15

References

External links
Profile at Maccabi-yafo.com
Profile at ONE

1987 births
Living people
Israeli footballers
Maccabi Netanya F.C. players
Hapoel Acre F.C. players
Maccabi Ironi Tirat HaCarmel F.C. players
Hapoel Hadera F.C. players
Maccabi Ironi Jatt F.C. players
Maccabi Jaffa F.C. players
Maccabi Petah Tikva F.C. players
Hapoel Afula F.C. players
Maccabi Daliyat al-Karmel F.C. players
Hapoel Kfar Saba F.C. players
Ironi Nesher F.C. players
Hapoel Asi Gilboa F.C. players
F.C. Kafr Qasim players
Hapoel Kfar Shalem F.C. players
Hapoel Marmorek F.C. players
Israeli Premier League players
Liga Leumit players
Footballers from Hadera
Association football forwards
Association football midfielders